A list of films produced in Brazil in 1944:

See also
 1944 in Brazil

References

External links
Brazilian films of 1944 at the Internet Movie Database

Brazil
1944
Films